Clémentine Célarié (born 12 October 1957) is a French actress, writer, director and singer.

Life and career
She was born as Meryem Célarié in Dakar in what was then the French colony of Senegal on 12 October 1957. After passing her Baccalaureate, she spent a year living in the United States. Back in France, she took acting lessons and became an actress.

She has three sons, Abraham, Gustave and Balthazar. She lives in Aix-en-Provence.

In the media
In 1994 Clémentine appeared on a TV show for Sidaction hosted by Christophe Dechavanne. In the show, Célarié shared a kiss with an HIV-positive man, to contribute to the fight against misconceptions about the virus.

Célarié supported Socialist Francois Hollande for the presidential election of 2012.

Author
 2003 : Marcella (Calmann-Lévy)
 2007 : Mes Ailes (Michel Lafon)
 2012 : Les Amoureuses (Le Cherche midi)
 2015 : On s'Aimera (Le Cherche midi)

Theatre

Filmography

References

External links

 

1957 births
Living people
People from Dakar
French film actresses
French television actresses
French women singers
20th-century French actresses
21st-century French actresses
Commandeurs of the Ordre des Arts et des Lettres